Exeter is a historic home located at Federalsburg, Caroline County, Maryland.  It is composed of two distinct sections constructed during the 19th century.  The front section is a three-bay wide, two-story frame structure covered with cypress shingles. Behind it is a -story frame wing, four bays long, covered with beaded weatherboard.  Outbuildings include a brick meathouse and frame milkhouse.

It was listed on the National Register of Historic Places in 1978.

References

External links
, including undated photo, at Maryland Historical Trust

Houses in Caroline County, Maryland
Houses on the National Register of Historic Places in Maryland
National Register of Historic Places in Caroline County, Maryland